This is a list of majority leaders of the Minnesota Senate. The Majority Leader is the head of the majority party in the Minnesota Senate, and is the most powerful political figure in the body.

List

Notes on Minnesota political party names 

Minnesota Democratic-Farmer-Labor Party: On April 15, 1944 the state Democratic Party and the Minnesota Farmer-Labor Party merged and created the Minnesota Democratic-Farmer-Labor Party (DFL). It is affiliated with the national Democratic Party.
Republican Party of Minnesota: From November 15, 1975 to September 23, 1995 the name of the state Republican party was the Independent-Republican party (I-R). The party has always been affiliated with the national Republican Party.

In 1913, Minnesota legislators began to be elected on nonpartisan ballots. Nonpartisanship also was an historical accident that occurred in the 1913 session when a bill to provide for no party elections of judges and city and county officers was amended to include the Legislature in the belief that it would kill the bill. Legislators ran and caucused as "Liberals" or "Conservatives" roughly equivalent in most years to Democratic-Farmer-Labor and Republican, respectively.  The law was changed in 1973, in 1976, Senate  members again ran with party designation.

Minnesota Legislature
M